Mamund Tehsil is a subdivision located in Bajaur District, Khyber Pakhtunkhwa, Pakistan. Mamund is the largest tehsil of district Bajaur.

History 
Bajaur was declared as a subdivision of the former Malakand Agency in 1960, and Mamund was established as a tehsil within the Bajaur subdivision. Bajaur was declared a Federally Administered Tribal Agency in December 1973. Mamund Subdivision joined Khyber Pakhtunkhwa on May 31, 2018 with the merger of the Federally Administered Tribal Areas. It was previously a tehsil before the FATA Interim Governance Regulation, 2018 was signed by President Mamnoon Hussain. With FATA's merger to Khyber Pakhtunkhwa, its status was upgraded to a subdivision.

Geography

Adjacent administrative units 
Dangam District, Kunar Province, Afghanistan (north)
Salarzai Subdivision (northeast)
Khar Bajaur Subdivision (south)
Nawagai Subdivision (southwest)
Sirkanay District, Kunar Province, Afghanistan (northwest)
Marawara District, Kunar Province, Afghanistan (northwest)

Demographics 

Mamund Subdivision has a population of 311,873 and has 35,269 households according to the 2017 census.

See also 
 List of tehsils of Khyber Pakhtunkhwa

References 

Tehsils of Khyber Pakhtunkhwa
Populated places in Bajaur District